SETWIN short for Society for Employment Promotion & Training in Twin Cities is an organization owned by Government of Telangana to create employment and self-employment opportunities to unemployed persons of twin cities of Hyderabad and Secunderabad by providing training in various courses at nominal fees.

History
SETWIN  was established on 15 August 1978. SETWIN was started under the patronage of Chief Minister Dr. Marri Channa Reddy with the Chairman and Managing Director Khader Ali Khan, IAS. After formation of Telangana state, chief Minister K.Chandrashekhar Rao appointed P.Vidyanadha Rao as Managing Director of Setwin in 2015. Mir Inayath Ali Baqri was appointed as Chairman SETWIN by the Chief Minister in 2017.

Organisation

In addition to its centres, SETWIN operates various production units such as printing presses, cane weaving centres, book binding.

Since 2007 SETWIN has extended its services from Hyderabad to districts to improve self-employment opportunities in rural areas. The 32nd and 33rd training centres of SETWIN were inaugurated at APSP 10th Battalion, Mahaboobnagr District and 2nd Battalion at APSP, Kurnool District by SETWIN Chairman Mohd Maqsood Ahmed.
In July 2015 SETWIN started the "Eeyoumin" scheme for students from poor minorities and as well providing placements to students who successfully complete their course and who enroll in the scheme. Students get free admission in the 16 different courses at different SETWIN training centres. This scheme was started by P. Vaidynath Rao, Managing Director of SETWIN in collaboration with the Department of Youth services and the Minority welfare department.

At present K.VenuGopala Rao, has taken charge as Managing Director, SETWIN. He is working hard for the development of SETWIN, He has brought many schemes and conducted job mela's for helping unemployed youth. With an idea to help unemployed youth and their career, SETWIN, Managing Director K.Venugopala Rao guided his employees to develop a site.

Transport services
In addition to providing training and operating various production units, SETWIN also operates minibuses to augment TSRTC services in Hyderabad. The SETWIN bus services were started in October 1979.

The SETWIN buses were stopped due to poor quality of buses and high accident rates. However, in 2006 the services were resumed.

References

External links 
 
 

State agencies of Telangana
Government of Telangana
Transport in Telangana
Organisations based in Hyderabad, India
Transport in Hyderabad, India
Organizations established in 1978
Employment agencies of India
1978 establishments in Andhra Pradesh
Public employment service